In college football, 2006 NCAA football bowl games may refer to:

2005–06 NCAA football bowl games, for games played in January 2006 as part of the 2005 season
2006–07 NCAA football bowl games, for games played in December 2006 as part of the 2006 season